Mikko Kousa (born 11 May 1988) is a Finnish professional ice hockey defenceman who currently plays for Düsseldorfer EG of the Deutsche Eishockey Liga (DEL).

Playing career 
He logged his first minutes in the Finnish top-flight Liiga during the 2007-08 season, representing the Lahti Pelicans. He later represented fellow Liiga clubs HIFK, Jokerit and Lukko, winning the title with HIFK in 2011.

Other stops in his resume include Torpedo Nizhny Novgorod and Medvescak Zagreb of the KHL, MODO Hockey of Sweden and SC Bern of Switzerland.

In early September 2016, he inked a deal with Lahti Pelicans of the Liiga.

International play
Kousa has played internationally for the Finnish men's national team on several occasions, including the Euro Hockey Tour.

References

External links

1988 births
Living people
Düsseldorfer EG players
Jokerit players
Finnish ice hockey defencemen
Lahti Pelicans players
HIFK (ice hockey) players
Torpedo Nizhny Novgorod players
Modo Hockey players
Lukko players
KHL Medveščak Zagreb players
SC Bern players
Finnish expatriate ice hockey people in Russia
Finnish expatriate ice hockey players in Sweden
Finnish expatriate sportspeople in Croatia
Finnish expatriate ice hockey people in Switzerland
Sportspeople from Lahti
Finnish expatriate ice hockey players in Germany
Expatriate ice hockey players in Croatia